= Giovanni Lodovico Longo =

Italian mathematician

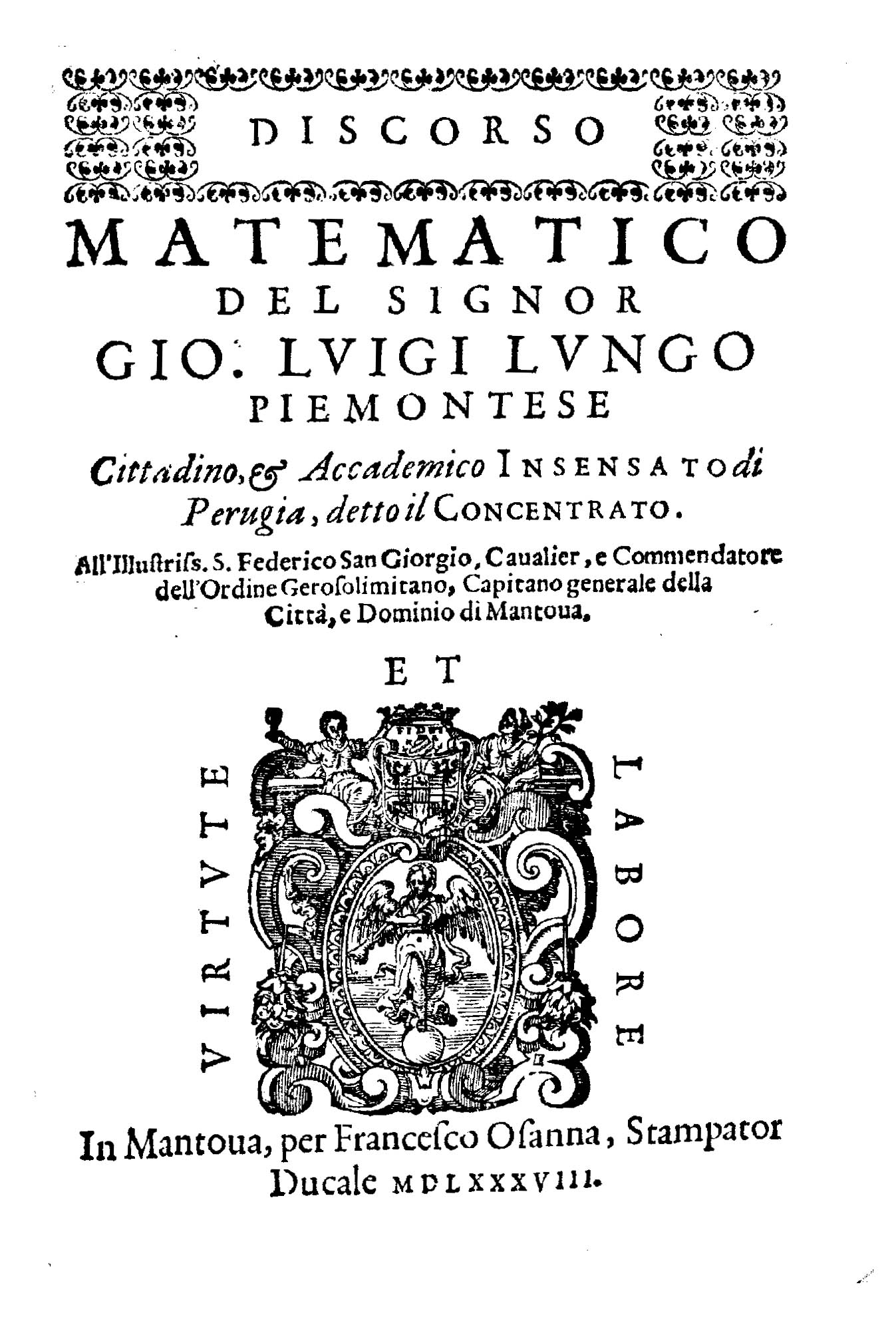
Discorso matematico (1588)

Giovanni Lodovico Longo, also known as Gio. Luigi Lungo (fl. 1588), was an Italian mathematician.

Born in Piedmont, he became a citizen of Perugia and there a member of the Academy of the Senseless (Accademia degli Insensati), where he was nicknamed "the Concentrate" (il Concentrato).

== Works ==
- Discorso matematico (in Italian). Mantua: Francesco Osanna. 1588.
- Ragionamento ... all'ill. Gio. Tomaso Valperga ... (in Italian). M.A. Bellone. 1591.
